is a Japanese animation studio based in Nishitōkyō, Tokyo.

Works

Television series

References

External links

  
 

 
Animation studios in Tokyo
Japanese animation studios
Japanese companies established in 2016
Mass media companies established in 2016
Nishitōkyō, Tokyo